Elephant Stone is a Canadian indie rock band. Fronted by Rishi Dhir, the band's style incorporates aspects of traditional Indian music including the sitar, tabla, and dilruba with Western psychedelic rock.

History
Dhir formed Elephant Stone in 2009 after he left The High Dials. The band began to combine Indian classical music and instrumentation with 1960s pop and rock.

The band's debut album, The Seven Seas, was released June 2, 2009 on Dhir's own Elephants on Parade label, with distribution by Fontana North. The album was a longlisted nominee for the 2009 Polaris Music Prize on June 15, 2009.

On July 4, 2009 The Seven Seas was released on Irish label Indiecater Records.

On February 12, 2013, their self-titled second album was released on Reverberation Appreciation Society.

The band's third full-length album, The Three Poisons, was released in 2014. In 2015, Burger Records released a cassette featuring a remixed version of The Three Poisons titled ES3PRMX. The cassette features collaborations with Anton Newcombe of The Brian Jonestown Massacre, Fabien Leseure, Tom Furse of The Horrors, Al Lover, Alex Maas of The Black Angels, Peter Holmstrom of The Dandy Warhols and JM Lapham of The Earlies.

In 2016 Elephant Stone released their fourth album, Ship of Fools. In 2017 they released an EP, Live at the Verge, and set out on a tour of Europe.

Elephant Stone released their fifth album, Hollow on February 14, 2020.

Discography

Albums 
 The Seven Seas (2009)
 Elephant Stone (2013)
 The Three Poisons (2014)
 Ship of Fools (2016)
 Hollow (2020)

EPs and singles 
 The Glass Box EP 12" (2010) - mini album
 Love the Sinner, Hate the Sin b/w Strangers 7" (2012)
 American Dream (2020)
 Le voyage de M. Lonely dans la lune (2022)

Remixes 
 ES3PRMX (2015) - Remix of The Three Poisons, cassette
 Remix of Fools (2017) - Remix of Ship of Fools
 GLIDExTDSESRMXv1.1 (2017)- Remix of Glide (The Dream Syndicate)

Other appearances 
 "Christmas Time (Is Here Again)" (Beatles cover) on Psych-Out Christmas (2013)
 "L.A. Woman" on A Psych Tribute to the Doors (2014)

Awards and nominations

|-
| 2022
| Le voyage de M. Lonely dans la lune
| GAMIQ - Rock EP of the Year
| Winner
|-
| 2009
| The Seven Seas
| Polaris Music Prize - Album of the Year
| Long-Listed

Personnel

Current band members
 Rishi Dhir – lead vocals, bass, sitar
 Miles Dupire-Gagnon – drums, backing vocals
 Robbie MacArthur - guitar, backing vocals
 Jason Kent - keys, guitar, backing vocals

Past band members
 Bobby Fraser - keys
 Jean-Gabriel Lambert – guitar, backing vocals
 Chris McCarron – guitar
 Mike O'Brien – guitar
 Jules Pampena – drums
 Greg Paquette – guitar
 Robb Surridge - drums
 Richard White – guitar
 Chris Wise - drums
 Stephen "The Venk" Venkatarangam - keys, sitar, bass

See also

Music of Canada
Music of Quebec
Canadian rock
List of Canadian musicians
List of bands from Canada
:Category:Canadian musical groups

References

External links
Elephant Stone
Indiecater Records 
The Reverberation Appreciation Society

Musical groups established in 2008
Canadian indie rock groups
Musical groups from Montreal
English-language musical groups from Quebec
2008 establishments in Quebec
Canadian psychedelic rock music groups